Kensington Roof Gardens (formerly known as Derry and Toms Roof Gardens and later The Roof Gardens) is a private roof garden covering  on top of the former Derry & Toms building on Kensington High Street in central London. 

Originally opened in 1938, the gardens were open to the public until January 2018 when the leaseholder, Virgin Limited Edition, was unable to reach an agreement with the freeholder about renewal of the lease.

History
Derry and Toms new Art Deco department store was opened in 1933. The gardens were laid out between 1936 and 1938 by Ralph Hancock, a landscape architect who had just created the "Gardens of the Nations" on the 11th floor of the RCA Building in New York, on the instructions of Trevor Bowen (then vice-president of Barkers, the department store giant that owned the site and constructed the building). They cost £25,000 to create and visitors were charged 1 shilling to enter. Money raised was donated to local hospitals and £120,000 was raised during the next 30 years.

The building housed the department store Derry and Toms until 1973, and then Biba until 1975. In 1978, the garden's Art Deco tea pavilion was redeveloped into a nightclub, in 1981 Virgin Limited Edition bought the lease to the roof garden and the pavilion, and in 2001 Virgin turned the pavilion into the Babylon restaurant.

The more than 100 trees in the garden were given a tree preservation order by Kensington & Chelsea council in 1976, the roof garden buildings were Grade II* listed by English Heritage in 1981 as part of a listing given the whole building, and the garden itself was given a Grade II listing in 1998 within the Register of Historic Parks and Gardens.

Virgin ceased its operation of the Roof Gardens in January 2018 and the site is currently closed to the public. It is unknown when it will reopen.

The gardens
It is divided into three themed gardens:

a Spanish garden, in a Moorish style based upon the Alhambra in Spain, with fountains, vine-covered walkways and Chusan palms;
a Tudor style garden, characterised by its archways, secret corners and hanging wisteria. Roses, lilies and lavender contribute the rich summer scent to the garden;
an English water garden, with over 100 species of trees, a stream, and a garden pond that is the home to pintail ducks and four flamingos called Bill, Ben, Splosh and Pecks. There are over 30 different species of trees in the water garden, including trees from the original planting over sixty years ago. The roof was designed to bear the load of one hundredweight per square foot (approximately 500 kilogrammes per square metre) with a drainage layer of brick and clinker beneath the soil. Although they are on a rooftop, the trees were made the subject of tree preservation orders in 1976.

Gallery

References

1938 establishments in England
Department store buildings in the United Kingdom
Grade II listed buildings in the Royal Borough of Kensington and Chelsea
Grade II listed parks and gardens in London
House of Fraser
Kensington
Nightclubs in London
Parks and open spaces in the Royal Borough of Kensington and Chelsea
Roof gardens
Virgin Group
Virgin Limited Edition